Roy Wilson may refer to:

Roy Wilson (British politician) (1876–1942), British Member of Parliament
Roy Wilson (baseball) (1896–1969), Major League Baseball player
Roy Wilson (Canadian politician) (born 1932), Canadian provincial politician
M. Roy Wilson, president of Wayne State University
Roy Wilson, Jamaican singer of Higgs and Wilson
Reno Wilson (Roy Wilson, born 1969), American actor